The University of Warmia and Mazury in Olsztyn was established on 1 September 1999, in accordance with the new Statute of Sejm signed by Polish President Aleksander Kwaśniewski, as well as Minister of Education Mirosław Handke, in August of the same year. Ryszard Górecki became its first chancellor. The Faculty of Theology was established with an agreement between the Polish Episcopate and the government, in the presence of Cardinal Józef Glemp and religious figures. The university's first academic year started in October 1999.

The core structure of the university was based on an agreement between the academic senates of three institutions of higher learning already established in the city: the Academy of Agriculture and Technology, the Pedagogical Institute, and the Warmia Institute of Theology.

The university has 16 faculties, out of which eight hold full academic rights and therefore entitle the university to operate as an autonomous unit.

Faculties
 The Faculty of Animal Bioengineering 
 The Faculty of Fine Arts
 The Faculty of Biology and Biotechnology
 The Faculty of Economic Sciences 
 The Faculty of Environmental Management and Agriculture 
 The Faculty of Environmental Sciences
 The Faculty of Food Sciences 
 The Faculty of Geoengineering
 The Faculty of Humanities 
 The Faculty of Law and Administration 
 The Faculty of Mathematics and Computer Sciences 
 Collegium Medicum: Faculty of Health Sciences and School of Medicine 
 The Faculty of Social Sciences
 The Faculty of Technical Sciences
 The Faculty of Theology
 The Faculty of Veterinary Medicine

Autonomous Entities
University Library
The University Library is a unit of University structure which performs teaching and research assignments, as well as provides services to other units. It is a scientific library accessible to everyone. Its book collection is the result of amalgamating the libraries of partner schools, including the seminary library, whose history dates back to the 16th century. The library building situated on the campus is a new "intelligent" building, with an integrated system managing all the systems inside (Building Management System), with air conditioning, monitoring and easy access for the disabled.
The Centre of Polish Culture and Language For Foreigners
One of the general public units of the University of Warmia and Mazury established on 28 January 2005 by the UWM Senate. The Centre is located in the new centre for the Faculty of Humanities in Kortowo.

University Publishing House

Notable alumni 
 Robert Biedroń (born 1976), politician
 Ryszard Bober (born 1956), politician
 Marian Jeliński (born 1949), author
 Kazimierz Plocke (born 1958), politician

See also
 Provincial Mental Sanatorium Kortau

References

External links

 University of Warmia and Mazury
 Faculty of Medical Sciences

 
Universities in Poland
Olsztyn
Educational institutions established in 1999
1999 establishments in Poland
Universities and colleges formed by merger in Poland